Danijela Branislav Cabric is an American electrical engineer. She is an associate professor in the Electrical and Computer Engineering Department at the University of California, Los Angeles.  During the COVID-19 pandemic, Cabric was elected a Fellow of the Institute of Electrical and Electronics Engineers (IEEE) for her "contributions to theory and practice of spectrum sensing and cognitive radio systems."

Early life and education
Cabric completed her Master's degree in Electrical Engineering at the University of California, Los Angeles and her PhD in the same subject from the University of California, Berkeley. As a graduate student, Cabric's first project was to design a high-speed frequency-hopping system, which resulted in the fastest frequency-hopping system ever built.

Career
Upon completing her formal education, Cabric accepted a faculty position at the UCLA Henry Samueli School of Engineering and Applied Science as an assistant professor in 2007. In this role, she continued her research into physical and network layer design for cognitive radios for opportunistic spectrum sharing; cognitive radio algorithms and architectures for spectrum sensing; adaptive transmission and spatial processing; and the development of wireless testbeds to support physical and network experiments. Her work was recognized by the Intelligence Advanced Research Projects Activity (IARPA) and she was the recipient of $500,000 seed contract to improve the safety of large-scale information systems. Cabric was also recognized for her efforts with the  National Science Foundation (NSF)  CAREER Award.

Throughout her tenure at UCLA, Cabric had led the Cognitive Reconfigurable Embedded Systems (CORE) research laboratory that focuses on the "theoretical modeling, algorithmic development, system implementation and experimental validation of the emerging wireless technologies including 5G millimeter-wave communications, distributed communications and sensing for Internet of Things, and machine learning for wireless networks co-existence and security." As a result of her efforts, Cabric appeared in the 2017 documentary Bombshell: The Hedy Lamarr Story. In 2018, she selected to serve as an Institute of Electrical and Electronics Engineers (IEEE) ComSoc Distinguished Lecturer and later received their Best Paper Award.

During the COVID-19 pandemic, Cabric and two of her graduate students received the Best Paper Award for their paper mRAPID: Machine Learning Assisted Noncoherent Compressive Millimeter-Wave Beam Alignment at 4th ACM Workshop on Millimeter-Wave Networks and Sensing Systems. She was also the recipient of the 2020 Qualcomm Faculty Award. In 2021, Cabric was elected a Fellow of the IEEE for her "contributions to theory and practice of spectrum sensing and cognitive radio systems."

References

External links

Living people
UCLA Henry Samueli School of Engineering and Applied Science alumni
University of California, Los Angeles faculty
UC Berkeley College of Engineering alumni
Fellow Members of the IEEE
American women engineers
Year of birth missing (living people)
21st-century American women